The Piano Tuner Has Arrived (Italian: È arrivato l'accordatore) is a 1952 Italian comedy film directed by  Duilio Coletti and starring Nino Taranto, Alberto Sordi and Virgilio Riento.

The film's sets were designed by Ottavio Scotti.

Cast
 Nino Taranto as Achille Scozzella  
 Alberto Sordi as Avvocato Adolfo  
 Virgilio Riento as Bartolomeo Porretti  
 Tamara Lees as Adelina Porretti  
 Antonella Lualdi as Giulietta Narducci 
 Ave Ninchi as Signora Narducci  
 Alberto Sorrentino as Signor Narducci  
 Fanfulla as Adetto militare di Limonia  
 Lia Di Leo as Cameriera  
 Sophia Loren as Amica di Giulietta  
 Galeazzo Benti as Un giornalista  
 Armando Migliari as Commissario Filippini  
 Giampiero Sammari as Il bambino  
 Silvio Bagolini as Un lestofante 
Natale Cirino as the wanted Danilo "Il magro" 
 Carlo Sposito 
 Carlo Delle Piane 
 Marco Tulli 
 Gondrano Trucchi 
 Arnaldo Mochetti
 Antonio Amendola
 Anna Arena 
 Mario Siletti 
 Alfredo Rizzo 
 Giuseppe Ricagno 
 Pasquale Fasciano
 Rino Leandri 
 Giuliana Farnese 
 Carla Bertinelli 
 Francesca Paoli 
 Pamela Palma 
 Nyta Dover
Guglielmo Inglese as band's cook

References

Bibliography
 Kerry Segrave & Linda Martin. The continental actress: European film stars of the postwar era. McFarland, 1990.

External links
 

1952 films
1952 comedy films
Italian comedy films
1950s Italian-language films
Films directed by Duilio Coletti
Films with screenplays by Ruggero Maccari
Films with screenplays by Mario Amendola
Italian black-and-white films
1950s Italian films